Hanang District is one of the six districts of the Manyara Region of Tanzania. It is bordered to the north by the Mbulu District and Babati Rural District, to the southeast by the Dodoma Region and to the southwest by the Singida Region. Mount Hanang is located within the boundaries of the district.

According to the 2002 Tanzania National Census, the population of the Hanang District was 205,133. According to the 2012 Tanzania National Census, the population of Hanang District was 275,990.

The District Commissioner of the Hanang District is Moses B. Sanga.

Transport
Paved trunk road T14 from Singida to Babati town passes through the district.

Administrative subdivisions
As of 2012, Hanang District was administratively divided into 25 wards.

Wards

 Balagidalalu
 Bassodesh
 Bassotu
 Dirma
 Endasak
 Endasiwold
 Ganana
 Gehandu
 Gendabi
 Getanuwas
 Gidahababieg
 Gisambalang
 Giting
 Hidet
 Hirbadaw
 Katesh
 Laghanga
 Lalaji
 Masakta
 Maskron
 Masqaroda
 Mogitu
 Nangwa
 Simbay
 Sirop

Notable persons from Hanang District
 Frederick Sumaye, 7th Tanzanian Prime Minister

References

Sources
Hanang District Homepage for the 2002 Tanzanian National Census
Tanzanian Government Directory Database

Districts of Manyara Region